Air UK Leisure was a British airline operating charter flights on behalf of its parent Air UK.

History

In June 1987 Air UK announced that it would start a new charter airline based at London Stansted Airport which would start operating in 1988 with two leased Boeing 737-200 aircraft.  The company Air UK (Leisure) Limited was formed in 1987 with Air UK providing 30% of the £2.5 million capital, B&C Holding (the parent company of Air UK) 30% with the rest from the travel group Viking International.

The airline started operations in 1988 with two leased Boeing 737-200 aircraft and placed orders for four new Boeing 737-400s from a leasing company for delivery in October 1988.  The first flight was from London Stansted Airport to Faro Airport in Portugal. The airline became the first operator of the Boeing 737-400 in Europe when the first aircraft was delivered on 14 October 1988.

The airline went on to operate seven Boeing 737-400s on both charter and scheduled services and to base aircraft at Manchester and Gatwick Airport as well as Stansted.

In 1993 the airline introduced two leased Boeing 767-300 aircraft on behalf of British holiday tour operator Unijet.

Leisure International Airways
In 1996 the airline was sold to the tour operator Unijet and was renamed Leisure International Airways and moved its main base to London Gatwick Airport.

On 29 March 1996 the airline introduced the first of three Airbus A320s into service to replace the Boeing 737-400s.

In 1998 First Choice acquired the airline when it took over Unijet, the aircraft fleet and operations were taken over by the First Choice airline Air 2000.

Fleet

Over the years, Air UK Leisure operated the following aircraft types:

See also
 List of defunct airlines of the United Kingdom

References

External links

Defunct airlines of the United Kingdom
Airlines established in 1987
Airlines disestablished in 1999